The Chain is a 1996 American action film directed by Luca Bercovici for Columbia Tristar and starring Gary Busey.

References

External links

1996 films
Films directed by Luca Bercovici